, is a Japanese manga series by Moyoco Anno.
North American publisher Vertical Inc published it in English in July 2012.

Plot 

The girl is very rebellious, leading to the heads of the household considering her potential future as a successful , as a high-ranking courtesan needs not only beauty and talent but also the tenacity to maintain their position in order to be successful.

Film
A live-action film adaptation was released in Japan on February 24, 2007. The film stars Anna Tsuchiya and marks the directorial debut of photographer Mika Ninagawa. Ringo Sheena's album Heisei Fūzoku acts as the soundtrack.

Cast
Anna Tsuchiya as Kiyoha
Ayame Koike as Young Kiyoha
Asuka Saito as Tomeki
Kippei Shiina as Kuranosuke
Yoshino Kimura as Takao
Hiroki Narimiya as Sojiro
Miho Kanno as Shohi
Masatoshi Nagase as Mitsunobu
Masanobu Andō as Seiji
Renji Ishibashi as Owner
Kyōko Koizumi as Oran

References

External links
 Official website for the film 
 IMDb entry

Kodansha manga
Manga adapted into films
Moyoco Anno
Seinen manga
Vertical (publisher) titles